Five Stories is a collection of stories, published in 1956 by the Estate of Willa Cather, after the author's death.  Several of these stories had been previously published in other collections.

Contents
This collection contains the following stories:
 "The Enchanted Bluff"
 "Tom Outland's Story"
 "Neighbour Rosicky"
 "The Best Years"
 "Paul's Case"
 Unfinished Avignon Story: An Article by George N. Kates

References

1956 short story collections
Short story collections by Willa Cather
Books published posthumously